Ginger Molloy (born 25 December 1937) is a former Grand Prix motorcycle road racer from New Zealand. He competed from 1965 to 1970 in the Grand Prix world championship. 

Growing up in Huntly, Molloy played rugby league for Huntly United alongside fellow future motorcycle champion Hugh Anderson. Molloy represented New Zealand schoolboys in rugby league before travelling to Europe in 1963.

He won his only world championship race in the 250cc class at the 1966 250cc Ulster Grand Prix, riding a Bultaco. His best season was in 1970 when he rode a Kawasaki H1R to a second place finish behind Giacomo Agostini in the 500cc world championship. New Zealand road racers had a string of second placings in the premier class –  Molloy in 1970, Keith Turner in 1971 and Kim Newcombe in 1973.

Grand Prix motorcycle racing results 
Points system from 1950 to 1968:

Points system from 1969 onwards:

(key) (Races in bold indicate pole position; races in italics indicate fastest lap)

References 

1937 births
Living people
125cc World Championship riders
250cc World Championship riders
350cc World Championship riders
500cc World Championship riders
Huntly United players
New Zealand motorcycle racers
New Zealand rugby league players
Sportspeople from Huntly, New Zealand
Rugby league players from Huntly, New Zealand
Rugby league wingers